Acmispon mearnsii, synonym Lotus mearnsii, is a species of flowering plant in the legume family endemic to Arizona in the United States. It known by the common name Mearns' bird's-foot trefoil. In Arizona, it occurs in Coconino, Navajo, and Yavapai Counties.

References

mearnsii
Flora of Arizona